Dothan (also Dotan) was a location mentioned twice in the Hebrew Bible. It has been identified with Tel Dothan, also known as Tel al-Hafireh, located adjacent to the Palestinian town of Bir al-Basha, and ten kilometers (driving distance) southwest of Jenin, near Dotan Junction of Route 60.

Identification

The modern consensus is that the archaeological site of Tel Dothan corresponds to ancient Dothan.

Eusebius places Dothan 12 miles to the north of Sebaste; broadly consistent with the modern location.

Other proposed locations
Van de Velde noted that the Crusaders and later mediaeval travellers had located Dothan at the village of Hittin.

Hebrew Bible
Dothan is first mentioned in the Hebrew Bible (Book of Genesis) in connection with the history of Joseph, as the place in which the sons of Jacob (Israel) had moved their sheep and, at the suggestion of Judah, the brothers sold Joseph to the Ishmaelite merchants. It later appears as the residence of Elisha (Second Book of Kings) and the scene of a vision of chariots and horses of fire surrounding the mountain on which the city stood.

The plain near Dothan is also mentioned in the apocryphal Book of Judith.

History and archaeology

Northern kingdom of Israel (Samaria)
The city served as an Israelite administrative centre, and archaeologist have discovered a large complex and Hebrew inscriptions at the site.

A bronze bull has been found in an Israelite sanctuary east of Tell Dothan, in the mountains of Samaria, dated to around the 11th century, which may be related to the episode of the golden calf.

Crusader period
Castellum Beleismum (Latin) or Chastiau St Job (medieval French) was the Frankish name of a tower built by the Crusaders on the ancient tell in 1156 and given to the Hospitallers in 1187.

Modern discovery
Charles William Meredith van de Velde visited the site in 1851, and was considered the first modern traveller to visit it. He described the discovery in his 1854 book:
...I saw a huge tell at the distance of only a few hundred yards from our way, covered over with ruins, and the fragment of an ancient aqueduct, that had been supported on arches. I asked Abu Monsur the name of the tell, and the answer was, "Haida Dothan" (that is, Dothan). "Dothan," I asked, "Dothan?" "Nahm; Dothan, Dothan, Dothan!" exclaimed the testy old shech, as if hurt at my not believing him at the instant. My object in reiterating the question was to get him to repeat the name; for the discovery of Dothan was a very special circumstance, with respect to which I was anxious to assure myself, by having the name properly pronounced.

Van de Velde's visit had taken place a few days before Edward Robinson's; Robinson credited van ve Velde with the discovery.

Modern use of the name
The Israeli settlement of Mevo Dotan (lit. Approach to Dothan) is named for the city, as is Dothan, Alabama in the US.

See also
Archaeology of Israel
List of biblical places
Jubb Yussef (Joseph's Well) in Galilee, believed by Muslims to be the site of Joseph's pit or well

References

Bibliography

 (pp. 116 -117)
  (p. 215)
 (pp. 219-222)
   (p. 57)
  (p. 194)
  (pp.  316 - 317)
 (pp.  149-150)

External links
Survey of Western Palestine, Map 11: IAA, Wikimedia commons
Dothan: Remains from the tel (1953-1964), Daniel M. Master

Book of Genesis
Torah cities
Canaanite cities
Archaeological sites in Samaria
Archaeological sites in the West Bank
Joseph (Genesis)